The 1994 1. divisjon, the highest women's football (soccer) league in Norway, began on 24 April 1994 and ended on 9 October 1994.

18 games were played with 3 points given for wins and 1 for draws. Number nine and ten were relegated, while two teams from the 2. divisjon were promoted through a playoff round.

Trondheims-Ørn won the league, losing only one game.

League table

Top goalscorers
 24 goals:
  Kristin Sandberg, Asker
 18 goals:
  Randi Leinan, Trondheims-Ørn
 17 goals:
  Ann Kristin Aarønes, Trondheims-Ørn
 16 goals:
  Katrin Skarsbø, Sprint/Jeløy
 14 goals:
  Elisabeth Brenne, Donn
  Brit Sandaune, Trondheims-Ørn
 13 goals:
  Agnete Carlsen, Sprint/Jeløy
 11 goals:
  Merete Myklebust, Trondheims-Ørn
 10 goals:
  Hege Riise, Setskog/Høland
  Monica Enlid, Trondheims-Ørn
 9 goals:
  Åse Iren Steine, Sandviken
  Anita Waage, Trondheims-Ørn

Promotion and relegation
 Fløya and Molde were relegated to the 2. divisjon.
 Grand Bodø and Kolbotn were promoted from the 2. divisjon through playoff.

References

League table
Fixtures
Goalscorers

Norwegian First Division (women) seasons
Top level Norwegian women's football league seasons
1
Nor
Nor